Sally Leys (Sally Penelope Leys) is a Canadian spongiologist. She is a professor of biology  at the University of Alberta where she and her colleagues study sponges in all their aspects including ecology, physiology, their adaptations to a fluid environment and the evolution of sensory systems using sponges as their model organism.  A current project is Evaluating ecosystem function, vulnerability, resilience, and ability to recover from multiple stressors.

She earned a B.Sc. in 1990 from the University of British Columbia and a Ph.D from University of Victoria in 1996, entitled Cytoskeletal architecture, organelle transport, and impulse conduction in hexactinellid sponge syncytia, followed by post-doctoral work in Barbados, in Marseille, and at the University of Queensland.

References 

Canadian women scientists
Year of birth missing (living people)
Living people
University of British Columbia Faculty of Science alumni
University of Victoria alumni
Presidents of the Canadian Society of Zoologists